My Childish Father (French: Mon gosse de père) is a 1930 French drama film directed by Jean de Limur and starring Adolphe Menjou, Roger Tréville and Alice Cocéa. It is based on the 1925 play of the same title by Léopold Marchand which was later remade in 1953 as My Childish Father.The film's sets were designed by the art director Jacques Colombier. It was one of twelve sound films produced by Pathé-Natan that year following the conversion from silent film. A separate English-Language version The Parisian was produced, also starring Menjou.

Cast
 Adolphe Menjou as Jérome
 Roger Tréville as 	Gerard
 Charles Redgie as 	Stanley
 Alice Cocéa as 	Yvonne
 Olga Valéry as Mado	
 Renee Savoye as Secretary
 Pauline Carton as 	The Concierge		
 André Marnay as 	Le petit sale
 André Volbert as 	Julien
 Marcello Spada  
 Nicole de Rouves
 Odette Barencey 	
 Fanny Clair		
 Meg Lemonnier

References

Bibliography
 Crafton, Donald. The Talkies: American Cinema's Transition to Sound, 1926-1931. University of California Press, 1999.
 Crisp, C.G. The Classic French Cinema, 1930-1960. Indiana University Press, 1993. 
 Goble, Alan. The Complete Index to Literary Sources in Film. Walter de Gruyter, 1999.

External links 
 

1930 films
1930s French-language films
1930 drama films
French drama films
Films directed by Jean de Limur
French films based on plays
Films set in Paris
Pathé films
1930s French films